Udzungwa Mountains National Park is a national park in Tanzania with a size of 1,990 km2 (770 miles2). The habitats contained within the national park include tropical rainforest, mountain forest, miombo woodland, grassland and steppe. There is a vertical height range of 250–2,576 metres (the peak of Lohomero), which incorporates the Udzungwa Mountains part of the Eastern Arc Mountains. There are more than 400 bird species, 2500 plant species (25% of which are endemics) and 6 primate species. It has the second largest biodiversity of a national park in Africa.

Six primate species have been recorded in the park, five of which are endemic. The Iringa red colobus and Sanje crested mangabey are only found in the Udzungwa Mountains National Park, the mangabey species was undetected by biologists prior to 1979.

Tourism in the Udzungwa Mountains national Park revolves around hiking and trekking, as the park has no roads and is accessible only on foot.  The hiking trails range in difficulty from the short one-hour Sonjo trek to the extremely challenging 6-day camping trek the Lumemo Trail.  The most common walk is the Sanje Waterfalls trail which takes approximately four hours to complete and allows the visitor access to the stunning 170 m waterfall and includes swimming in the waterfall plunge pools as part of the activity.

Accommodation for visitors within the park is only possible on a camping basis as there are no lodges within the park borders.  Within the nearby village of Mang'ula there are also a couple of local guesthouses providing a budget option.

Image gallery

References

External links 

 Udzungwa Mountains National Park
 Udzungwa Mountains NP
 Hondo Hondo Udzungwa Forest Tented Camp

Eastern Arc forests
Eastern Arc Mountains
National parks of Tanzania
Geography of Iringa Region
Tourist attractions in the Iringa Region
Important Bird Areas of Tanzania